Caroline Hirons is a Confederation of International Beauty Therapy and Cosmetology (CIBTAC) qualified aesthetician, writer and, according to the Guardian, the "queen of skincare".

Biography 
Hirons was born in Liverpool and spent some of her childhood in the US. Her mother and grandmother worked in the beauty sections of department stores and she was influenced by their experiences and work ethic. At 17, in 1987, Hirons moved to London, where she worked in a record shop. She had two children with her husband Jim. In 1997 she started worked for Aveda at Harvey Nichols. She trained as a beauty therapist and had two more children, eventually joined Space NK. 

In 2010 she started blogging at the age of 40 and her blog took off in popularity. She was also a YouTuber, but left YouTube in 2021. In 2020 she published her book Skincare, which won the Non-Fiction Lifestyle Book of the Year 2021 at the British Book Awards. The book was a Number 1 Sunday Times Bestseller and is the UK’s bestselling skincare title of all time. An updated version, Skincare: The New Edit, was published in November 2021.

During the COVID-19 pandemic in the United Kingdom, Caroline launched the Beauty Backed fundraising initiative to support those in the industry who were directly impacted by the pandemic and subsequent lockdowns. The initiative raised over £600,000 between August and December of that year alone. In July 2022, Hirons launched the world’s most comprehensive skincare app, Skin Rocks. Reviews said that the app, which shot to number one on the Free App Download Chart, was "like having a skin expert in your pocket" and the "ultimate skincare shopping assistant". November 2022 saw Hirons launch her first ever Skin Rocks skincare line, starting with two retinoid products. Hirons is married with four children.

Awards and honours
 Skincare (2020), Non-Fiction Lifestyle Book of the Year 2021 at the British Book Awards

References 

Living people
Year of birth missing (living people)